The men's 56 kilograms event at the 1998 Asian Games took place on 7 December 1998 at Thunder Dome, Maung Thong Thani Sports Complex.

Schedule
All times are Indochina Time (UTC+07:00)

Results 
Legend
NM — No mark

 Ayed Khawaldeh of Jordan originally finished with no mark, but was disqualified after he tested positive for triamterene.

References
 Results

External links
 Weightlifting Database

Weightlifting at the 1998 Asian Games